Michael "Mick" Slicker (born 16 August 1978) is a former professional rugby league footballer who played in the 1990s and 2000s.

International honours
Mick Slicker won 2 caps (plus 1 as substitute) for Ireland in 2001–2003 while at Huddersfield Giants.

Personal life
Michael has 2 daughters, Megan and Brogan and a wife called Kelly. They currently live in Oldham.

References

1978 births
Halifax R.L.F.C. players
Huddersfield Giants players
Ireland national rugby league team players
Keighley Cougars players
Living people
People from Oldham
Rugby league props
Sheffield Eagles (1984) players